Barry Schwartz (born 1980) is a blogger who writes about search engines and search engine marketing.  Schwartz is the founder and currently the editor of Search Engine Roundtable, an online news site covering the search engines and search engine marketing.  He also is the CEO & President of RustyBrick, Inc., a New York-based web development company, and a news editor at Search Engine Land, a search engine news site founded by Danny Sullivan.  Previously, Schwartz was a writer for Search Engine Watch.  He also moderates online and offline panels at Search Engine Watch, Cre8asite Forums and WebmasterWorld's PubCon.

He has been interviewed by NBC Nightly News and USA Today about Search Marketing, and has been quoted by news organizations reporting on the Internet Marketing space.  He is also the organizer of the annual Search Marketing Expo (SMX) in Israel, and is a member of the Internet Marketers – New York. He was also the host of the Search Pulse podcast on WebmasterRadio.FM. 

In 2022 Schwartz founded a news site, LucidInsider.com, which covers the electric car company Lucid Motors.

Biography 
Schwartz is a graduate of Baruch College, City University of New York and lives in Rockland County, New York. He is married and has three daughters and two sons.

References

External links
 Barry Schwartz at Search Engine Roundtable

1980 births
Baruch College alumni
Search engine optimization consultants
Living people